William Henry Raybould (born 6 May 1944) is a former  international rugby union player.

He was capped eleven times as a centre for Wales between 1967 and 1970, winning his last cap as a replacement. He scored one drop goal for Wales.

Raybould was selected for the 1968 British Lions tour to South Africa but did not play in any of the internationals against .

He represented Cambridge in the 1966 Varsity Match and played club rugby for Cardiff, London Welsh and Newport

References

External links
Newport Gwent Dragons Personnel Profile

1944 births
Living people
Barbarian F.C. players
Bridgend RFC players
British & Irish Lions rugby union players from Wales
Cambridge University R.U.F.C. players
Cardiff RFC players
London Welsh RFC players
Newport RFC players
Rugby union centres
Rugby union players from Cardiff
Wales international rugby union players
Welsh rugby union players
Welsh schoolteachers